Stuart Rendell (born 30 June 1972 in Canberra to Carole and Ralph Rendell) is an Australian retired hammer thrower. He competed in the 2000 and 2004 Olympics, but failed to qualify from his pool. His personal best throw is 79.29 metres, achieved in July 2002 in Varaždin. This is the current Oceanian record. He retired from athletics in 2006 after winning his second Commonwealth Games gold medal at the Melbourne Commonwealth Games, Australia, with a Games Record distance of 77.53m. Rendell taught at Miles Franklin Primary School from 2005 to 2008, before moving to the Garran Primary School at the start of 2009, but then moved to Calwell Primary School.

Achievements

References
Profile

1972 births
Living people
Australian male hammer throwers
Athletes (track and field) at the 1998 Commonwealth Games
Athletes (track and field) at the 2002 Commonwealth Games
Athletes (track and field) at the 2006 Commonwealth Games
Athletes (track and field) at the 2000 Summer Olympics
Athletes (track and field) at the 2004 Summer Olympics
Olympic athletes of Australia
Sportspeople from Canberra
Commonwealth Games gold medallists for Australia
Australian Institute of Sport track and field athletes
Commonwealth Games medallists in athletics
ACT Academy of Sport alumni
Medallists at the 1998 Commonwealth Games
Medallists at the 2006 Commonwealth Games